KGRA (98.9 FM) is a commercial radio station that serves the Jefferson, Iowa area.  Formerly broadcasting a Classic Hits format, the station now broadcasts Real Country.

Until January 31, 2012, KGRA was licensed to Coon Valley Communications, Inc which was owned by Patrick Delaney who also owned KDLS (AM) in Perry, Iowa and KKRF in Stuart, Iowa.

On February 1, 2012, Patrick Delany of Perry, owner of Coon Valley Communications, Inc, sold his company to Mel Suhr of Knoxville, owner of M&M Broadcasting, Inc.

With an agreement reached on January 27, 2012, and having an effective purchase date of February 1, 2012, M&M Broadcasting, Inc, a subsidiary of M and H Broadcasting, Inc, purchased Coon Valley Communications.   M and H Broadcasting, Inc is owned by Mel and Holly Suhr of Knoxville, Iowa.  M and H Broadcasting, Inc also owns KRLS 92.1 FM and KNIA 1320 AM at Knoxville.  They also own Home Broadcasting, Inc which owns KCII 1380 AM and KCII-FM 106.1 FM at Washington.

The station was originally licensed as KLSN on November 10, 1988, but changed callsigns to KGRA on February 4, 1994.

The transmitter and broadcast tower are located 8 miles west of Jefferson near Scranton, Iowa. The distance between KGRA and KKRF, its other "True Country" station is approximately 44 miles.

References

External links

Raccoon Valley Radio

GRA